Homotrixa is a genus of flies in the family Tachinidae.

Species
 Homotrixa brevifacies Villeneuve, 1914

References

Tachinidae